The shot put at the Summer Olympics is one of four track and field throwing events held at the multi-sport event. The men's shot put has been present on the Olympic athletics programme since 1896 (one of two throws events at the first Olympics, alongside the discus). The women's event was added to the programme at the 1948 Olympics just over fifty years later.

Two variations on the event have been contested at the Olympics: a two-handed competition at the 1912 Stockholm Olympics, with athletes using both left and right arm putting techniques, and a stone throw at the 1906 Intercalated Games.

Medalists

Men

Multiple medalists

Medalists by country

Women

Multiple medalists

Medalists by country

  The German total includes teams both competing as Germany and the United Team of Germany, but not East or West Germany.

Intercalated Games
The 1906 Intercalated Games were held in Athens and at the time were officially recognised as part of the Olympic Games series, with the intention being to hold a games in Greece in two-year intervals between the internationally held Olympics. However, this plan never came to fruition and the International Olympic Committee (IOC) later decided not to recognise these games as part of the official Olympic series. Some sports historians continue to treat the results of these games as part of the Olympic canon.

At this event a men's shot put was held and Martin Sheridan of the United States won the competition. Hungary's Mihály Dávid was the runner-up while Swedish thrower Eric Lemming was the bronze medalist.

A stone throw event, similar to the shot put, was also contested for the first and only time at an Olympic event. Athletes were allowed to throw rather than put the implement, which weighed 14 pounds (6.35 kg). Nikolaos Georgantas won the event for the host nation, while Sheridan (filling in for his absent team mate, Jim Mitchel) placed second. Another Greek, Mikhail Dorizas, came third.

Two-handed shot put
At the 1912 Stockholm Olympics a two-handed variant of the standard shot put competition took place. Each athlete had three attempts at the shot using each hand and their score was calculated by adding their best performances for the left and right hands. It featured two rounds, with the top three after the first round receiving a further three attempts with each arm.

Ralph Rose, a two-time Olympic champion in the standard shot put, topped the competition. Pat McDonald, who defeated Rose in the 1912 regular shot put final, took the silver medal. Elmer Niklander of Finland came third and went on to place in the top four of all the Olympic shot put and discus events that year.

References
Participation and athlete data
 Athletics Men's Shot Put Medalists. Sports Reference. Retrieved on 2014-04-18.
 Athletics Women's Shot Put Medalists. Sports Reference. Retrieved on 2014-04-18.
Olympic record progressions
 Mallon, Bill (2012). TRACK & FIELD ATHLETICS - OLYMPIC RECORD PROGRESSIONS. Track and Field News. Retrieved on 2014-03-12.
Specific

External links
 IAAF shot put homepage
 Official Olympics website
 Olympic athletics records from Track & Field News

 
Olympics
Shot put